Orhaneli power station is a small lignite coal-fired power station in Orhaneli, Bursa Province, Turkey.

History 
The power station was completed in 1991. It was shutdown in January 2020 for not meeting new emission rules but reopened in June with a temporary licence to January 2021.

Environment 
Right to Clean Air Platform has called for flue gas emissions figures to be released.

References

External links
 

Coal-fired power stations in Turkey
Bursa Province